The following is a list of active professional theatres and concert halls in the United Kingdom.  They are organised alphabetically in name order.

A

B

C

D

E

F

G

H

J

K

L

M

N

O

P

Q

R

S

T

U

V

W

Y

Z

References 

!
United Kingdom
Theatres